APEX stands for Additive System of Photographic Exposure, which
was proposed in the 1960 ASA standard
for monochrome film speed, ASA PH2.5-1960,
as a means of simplifying exposure computation.

Exposure equation

Until the late 1960s, cameras did not have built-in exposure meters, and
many photographers did not have external exposure meters.  Consequently,
it often was necessary to calculate exposure from
lighting conditions.  The relationship of recommended photographic exposure
to a scene's average luminance is given by the camera exposure equation

where

  is the f-number (reciprocal of the relative aperture)
  is the exposure time ("shutter speed") in seconds
  is the average scene luminance ("brightness")
  is the ASA arithmetic film speed
  is the reflected-light meter calibration constant

Use of the symbol  for luminance reflects photographic
industry practice at the time of ASA PH2.5-1960; current SI practice prefers the symbol .  German sources typically used  for the relative aperture.  Many authors now use
time.

Recommendations for the value of the calibration constant  in
applicable ANSI and ISO standards have varied slightly over the
years; this topic is discussed in greater detail under
Exposure meter calibration
in the Light meter article.

Exposure value

In an attempt to simplify choosing among combinations of equivalent camera settings, the concept of exposure values (German: Lichtwert) was originally developed and proposed to other manufacturers by the German shutter manufacturer  in the early 1950s. Combinations of shutter speed and relative aperture that resulted in the same exposure were said to have the same exposure value , a base-2 logarithmic scale defined by

When applied to the left-hand side of the exposure equation,  denoted combinations of camera settings; when applied to the right-hand side,  denoted combinations of luminance and film speed. For a given film speed, the recommended exposure value was determined solely by the luminance. Once the exposure value was determined, it could be directly set on cameras with an  scale. Adjustment of exposure was simple, because a change of 1  corresponded to a change of 1 exposure step, i.e., either a halving or doubling of exposure.

Starting 1954, the so-called Exposure Value Scale (EVS), originally known as Light Value Scale (LVS), was adopted by Rollei, Hasselblad, Voigtländer, Braun, Kodak, Seikosha, Aires, Konica, Olympus, Ricoh and others, introducing lenses with coupled shutters and apertures, such that, after setting the exposure value, adjusting either the shutter speed or aperture made a corresponding adjustment in the other to maintain a constant exposure. On some models, the coupling of shutter speed and aperture setting was optional, so that photographers could choose their preferred method of working depending on the situation. Use of the  scale on such cameras is discussed briefly by Adams (1981, 39).

Modern cameras no longer display exposure values as such, but continue to offer exposure modes, which support users in employing the concept of counter-adjusting shutter speed and aperture at a fixed point of exposure. This can be found in features such as Manual Shift on some Minolta, Konica Minolta and Sony Alpha or Hyper Manual on some Pentax (D)SLRs since 1991, where the photographer can change one of the parameters, and the camera will adjust the other accordingly for as long as the Auto-Exposure Lock (AEL) function is activated. In a wider sense, functions like , Pa / Ps Creative Program Control (by Minolta, Konica Minolta and Sony) or Hyper Program (by Pentax) belong to this group of features as well.

The additive (logarithmic) system

Although some photographers (Adams 1981, 66) routinely determined camera settings using the exposure equation, it generally was assumed that doing so would prove too daunting for the casual photographer.  The 1942 ASA exposure guide, ASA Z38.2.2-1942, featured a dial calculator,
and revisions in 1949 and 1955 used a similar approach.

An alternative simplification also was possible: ASA PH2.5-1960 proposed extending the concept of exposure value to all exposure parameters. Taking base-2 logarithms of both sides of the exposure equation and separating numerators and denominators reduces exposure calculation to a matter of addition:

where

  is the aperture value:    
  is the time value:  
  is the exposure value: .
  is the speed value (aka sensitivity value):  
  is the luminance value (aka brightness value):  
  is a constant that establishes the relationship between the ASA arithmetic film speed  and the ASA speed value .

  is the reflected-light meter calibration constant

ASA standards covered incident-light meters as well as reflected-light meters; the incident-light exposure equation is

where

  is the scene illuminance
  is the incident-light meter calibration constant

ASA PH2.12-1961 included incident-light metering in the APEX concept:

where

  is the incident-light value:  

(German sources typically use  (for Lichtwert or Belichtungswert — but not to be confused with the English term light value) instead of the exposure value's symbol . Consequently, the aperture value  is referred to as Blendenleitwert , and the time value  as Zeitleitwert . The film speed value  is named Empfindlichkeitsleitwert, and the brightness value  is known as Objekthelligkeit.)

APEX in practice

APEX made exposure computation a relatively simple matter; the foreword of ASA PH2.5-1960 recommended that exposure meters, exposure calculators, and exposure tables be modified to incorporate the logarithmic values that APEX required.  In many instances, this was done: the 1973 and 1986 ANSI exposure guides, ANSI PH2.7-1973 and ANSI PH2.7-1986, eliminated exposure calculator dials in favor of tabulated APEX values.  However, the logarithmic markings for aperture and shutter speed required to set the computed exposure were never incorporated in consumer cameras.  Accordingly, no reference to APEX was made in ANSI PH3.49-1971 (though it was included in the Appendix). The incorporation of exposure meters in many cameras in the late 1960s eliminated the need to compute exposure, so APEX saw little actual use.

With the passage of time, formatting of APEX quantities has varied considerably; although the  originally was subscript, it sometimes was given simply as lower case, and sometimes as uppercase.
luminance, and illuminance) used at the time APEX was proposed are in conflict with current preferred SI practice.

A few artifacts of APEX remain.  Canon, Pentax and Leica cameras use 'Av' and 'Tv' to indicate relative aperture and shutter speed as well as to symbolize aperture priority and shutter priority modes. Some Pentax DSLRs even provide a 'TAv' exposure mode to automatically set the ISO speed depending on the desired aperture and shutter settings, and 'Sv' (for sensitivity priority) to pre-set the ISO speed and let the camera choose the other parameters. Some meters, such as Pentax spot meters, directly indicate the exposure value for ISO 100 film speed. For a given film speed, exposure value is directly related to luminance, although the relationship depends on the reflected-light meter calibration constant .  Most photographic equipment manufacturers specify metering sensitivities in EV at ISO 100 speed (the uppercase 'V' is almost universal).

It is common to express exposure increments in EV, as when adjusting exposure relative to what a light meter indicates (Ray 2000, 316). For example, an exposure compensation of +1 EV (or +1 step) means to increase exposure, by using either a longer exposure time or a smaller -number.
The sense of exposure compensation is opposite that of the EV scale itself.
An increase in exposure corresponds to a decrease in EV, so an exposure compensation of
+1 EV results in a smaller EV; conversely, an exposure compensation of −1 EV results in a greater EV.

Use of APEX values in Exif

APEX has seen a partial resurrection in the Exif standard, which calls for storing exposure data using APEX values.  There are some minor differences from the original APEX in both terminology and values.  The
implied value (1/3.125) for the speed scaling constant  given in the Exif 2.2 specification ("Exif 2.2"; JEITA 2002) differs slightly from the APEX value of  (0.2973); with the Exif value, an ISO arithmetic film speed of 100 corresponds exactly to a speed value  of 5.

Because Exif 2.2 records ISO arithmetic speed rather than film sensitivity, the value of  affects the recorded value of  but not the recorded film speed.

The example data in Annex C of Exif 2.2 give 1 footlambert for  = 0. With  in cd/m2, this becomes 10.7, which is slightly less than the value of 12.5 recommended by ISO 2720:1974 and currently used by many manufacturers. The difference possibly arises from rounding  in the example table; it also is possible that the example data simply were copied from an old ASA or ANSI standard.

Notes

References

 Adams, Ansel.  1981. The Negative. Boston: New York Graphic Society. 
 ANSI PH2.7-1973. American National Standard Photographic Exposure Guide. New York: American National Standards Institute. Superseded by ANSI PH2.7-1986.
 ANSI PH2.7-1986. American National Standard for Photography — Photographic Exposure Guide. New York: American National Standards Institute.
 ANSI PH3.49-1971. American National Standard for general-purpose photographic exposure meters (photoelectric type). New York: American National Standards Institute. After several revisions, this standard was withdrawn in favor of ISO 2720:1974.
 ASA PH2.5-1960.  American Standard Method for Determining Speed of photographic Negative Materials (Monochrome, Continuous Tone).  New York: United States of America Standards Institute.
 ASA PH2.12-1961.  American Standard, General-Purpose Photographic Exposure Meters (photoelectric type).  New York: American Standards Association.  Superseded by ANSI PH3.49-1971.
 ASA Z38.2.2-1942.  American Emergency Standard Photographic Exposure Computer.  New York: American Standards Association.
 ASA Z38.2.6-1948. American Standard for General-Purpose Photographic Exposure Meters (Photoelectric Type). New York: American Standards Association.  Superseded by ASA PH2.12-1957.
  ISO 2720:1974. General Purpose Photographic Exposure Meters (Photoelectric Type)—Guide to Product Specification. International Organization for Standardization.
 Japan Electronics and Information Technology Industries Association. 2002. JEITA CP-3451, Exchangeable image file format for digital still cameras: Exif Version 2.2 (PDF). Japan Electronics and Information Technology Industries Association.
 JEITA. See Japan Electronics and Information Technology Industries Association.
 Ray, Sidney F. 2000. Camera Exposure Determination. In The Manual of Photography: Photographic and Digital Imaging, 9th ed. Ed. Ralph E. Jacobson, Sidney F. Ray, Geoffrey G. Atteridge, and Norman R. Axford.  Oxford: Focal Press.

External links
 Doug Kerr's in-depth description of APEX

Photographic techniques